Nguyễn Văn Bình (born December 1, 1939) is a Vietnamese former judoka.  He was a judo competitor for South Vietnam during the 1964 Olympic Games in Tokyo, Japan.

He started training in judo in 1953 and would become a national champ by the year 1956 under Cu Ton.

He competed at the age of 24, and would place 19th in the Men's lightweight division. He would become a 7th degree black belt in Judo.

In 1962 he started to study Taekwon-do.  This was under Nam Tae Hi who was a Korean military instructor as part of the initial group of officers in the South Vietnamese Army.   He was able to study under and work with Taekwon-do's founder General Choi Hong Hi starting 1967. He would establish 9 schools of martial arts in Vietnam and teach over 60,000 students before the Fall of Saigon in 1975.   He would later earn a 9th degree blackbelt in Taekwondo,  and operates a school with his family in Houston Texas teaching Taekwon-do, Judo, Aikido and Tai Chi. He is the President of ITF-USA and has supported the younger generation of Taekwon-do instructors in Texas and across the United States through seminars, examinations, administrative advice and continued leadership.

See also
List of taekwondo grandmasters

References

External links
Olympic match 1964 video
Biography video
Van Binh Self Defense Academy - Access to Grand Master Van Binh's academy website

1939 births
Living people
Olympic judoka of Vietnam
Judoka at the 1964 Summer Olympics
Vietnamese male judoka
Sportspeople from Hanoi
Vietnamese male taekwondo practitioners
20th-century Vietnamese people